Marilyn Jarrett (née Black) (March 4, 1939 – March 10, 2006) was an American politician and businesswomen.

Career
Jarrett was born in Snowflake, Arizona. She went to Arizona State University and Brigham Young University. Jarrett was involved in the real estate business and the sew fabric business. She lived in Mesa, Arizona. Jarrett served in the Arizona House of Representatives from 1995 to 2001 and was a Republican. She then served in the Arizona Senate from 2001 until her death in 2006. Jarrett died at St. Joseph's Hospital and Medical Center, in Phoenix, Arizona, after collapsing at her legislative office.

Legacy
She was the last person to lay-in-state at the Arizona State Capitol prior to Senator John McCain in 2018. She was a Latter-day Saint.

Notes

External links
 

1939 births
2006 deaths
Politicians from Mesa, Arizona
People from Snowflake, Arizona
Arizona State University alumni
Brigham Young University alumni
Businesspeople from Arizona
Women state legislators in Arizona
Republican Party members of the Arizona House of Representatives
Republican Party Arizona state senators
Latter Day Saints from Arizona